Daniel A. Keim is a German computer scientist and full professor (Chair of Information Processing) in the Computer Science department at the University of Konstanz, Germany. He received his Ph.D. in computer science from the University of Munich in 1994. He has been assistant professor in the Computer Science department at the University of Munich, and associate professor in the Computer Science department of the Martin Luther University of Halle-Wittenberg. Keim has also worked as a senior researcher at AT&T's Shannon Research Labs, Florham Park, NJ, USA.

Keim has published extensively on topics specifically related to information visualization and data mining, and has given tutorials on related issues at several large conferences. He is an editor of TKDE and the Information Visualization Journal.

Publications 
See Publications at Google Scholar.

External links 
 Homepage at Uni-Konstanz.de.

Living people
Information visualization experts
Year of birth missing (living people)
German computer scientists
Academic staff of the University of Konstanz